Bernard Alexander Quinn (born 17 September 1947) is a retired Scottish footballer who played as a full back in the Scottish League for Queen's Park and Queen of the South. He was capped by Scotland at amateur level.

References 

Scottish footballers
Scottish Football League players
Queen's Park F.C. players
Association football fullbacks
Scotland amateur international footballers
Footballers from Glasgow
1947 births
Queen of the South F.C. players
Living people
People from Govan